Donald L. Babets & others vs. Secretary Of Human Services & another, 403 Mass. 230 (1988), known informally as Babets vs. Johnston, was a Massachusetts Supreme Judicial court case relating to Don Babets and David Jean’s struggle to become foster parents as a gay couple. The case resulted in Massachusetts settling the lawsuit by returning to the “best interests of the child policy”, eliminating policies that considered the sexual orientation of potential foster parents when looking at foster placement.

Background of the case 

In April 1985, Babets and Jean began fostering two brothers from the Massachusetts foster care system, becoming the first openly gay foster parents. A few weeks later, journalist Ken Cooper from the Boston Globe published an article titled 'Some Oppose Foster Placement with Gay Couple', despite Babets' objections to the article being published. The day that the article was published, the children were taken away from Babets and Jean by social workers. Then, the Massachusetts Department of Social Services announced an all but ban on gay couples becoming foster parents; foster placement would look first for families, then for straight couples, then for single people, and sexual orientation would be asked about.

In response to these policy changes, Babets and Jean decided to sue. Along with two other foster parents and the Massachusetts Chapter of the National Association of Social Workers, Babets and Jean filed a lawsuit against the state that challenged the new policies as violating state and federal constitutional rights to equal protection and due process of law.

Joan A. Lukey (Special Assistant Attorney General) and Patrick M. Reagan represented the defendants, and Anthony M. Doniger, Susan A. Hartnett, and Marjorie Heins represented the plaintiffs.

During the case, the plaintiffs requested documents from the defendants that detailed the internal processes by which the policies in question were developed. The defendants argued that they were not required to produce these documents.

The court's decision and case outcome 

The lawsuit was filed on the basis that the new regulations "irrationally and arbitrarily categorize foster parent applicants by marital status and sexual preference in such a way as to exclude single persons, unmarried couples and gay [i.e., homosexual] men and lesbians from equal consideration as foster parents." The plaintiffs argued that the new regulations violated their State and Federal constitutional rights to equal protection, due process, freedom of association, and privacy, as well as the State and Federal laws requiring that foster care placement benefit the best interest of the child.

Following the lawsuit, civil action began in the Massachusetts Superior Court on January 30, 1986. During the case, the plaintiffs requested from the defendants documents detailing the internal processes in which the new regulations in question were developed (such as drafts of proposed regulations). The State denied the request for certain documents, citing governmental privilege. However, the judge found that no such privilege existed, and therefore that the State would need to release the requested documents.

At this point, the Supreme Judicial Court granted a request for direct review of the case. After hearing arguments for both sides, the Court upheld the original ruling, and declined to implement an Executive privilege law that would exempt the State from producing internal documents requested in action against the State.

In response to this ruling, the State decided to settle the lawsuit by dropping the new regulations.

Aftermath 

The state settled the case and the new regulations were dropped, with a return to the “best interests of the child” standard.

The case also helped cement GLAD's role as an important advocate for equality, and implicated Presidential hopeful Governor Michael Dukakis in perceived anti-gay activity.

References 

Massachusetts Supreme Judicial Court cases
United States LGBT rights case law